Ransom Township is a civil township of Hillsdale County in the U.S. state of Michigan.  The population was 1,012 at the 2020 census.

Communities

Geography

Historic sites
Trunk Line Bridge No. 237 is an arch bridge listed on the National Register of Historic Places. Built in 1918, it carries Burt Road over Silver Creek.

Major highways
 runs south–north through the center of the township.

Demographics
As of the census of 2000, there were 982 people, 324 households, and 256 families residing in the township. There were 353 housing units at an average density of 11.7 per square mile (4.5/km). The racial makeup of the township was 98.07% white, 0.10% Asian, 0.41% from other races, and 1.43% from two or more races. Hispanic or Latino of any race were 1.43% of the population.

There were 324 households, out of which 40.1% had children under the age of 18 living with them, 68.5% were married couples living together, 5.6% had a female householder with no husband present, and 20.7% were non-families. 17.9% of all households were made up of individuals, and 6.5% had someone living alone who was 65 years of age or older.  The average household size was 2.97 and the average family size was 3.34.

In the township the population was spread out, with 31.6% under the age of 18, 7.1% from 18 to 24, 27.0% from 25 to 44, 24.1% from 45 to 64, and 10.2% who were 65 years of age or older.  The median age was 35 years. For every 100 females, there were 110.3 males.  For every 100 females age 18 and over, there were 106.1 males.

The median income for a household in the township was $40,069, and the median income for a family was $43,264. Males had a median income of $31,806 versus $22,438 for females. The per capita income for the township was $15,904.  About 8.0% of families and 13.4% of the population were below the poverty line, including 19.9% of those under age 18 and 7.4% of those age 65 or over.

Education
The township is served by three separate public school districts.  The western portion of the township is served by Camden-Frontier Schools to the southwest in Amboy Township.  The northeast portion of the township is served by Pittsford Area Schools to the northeast in Pittsford.  A small portion of the southeast corner of the township is served by Waldron Area Schools to the east in Wright Township.

References

Townships in Hillsdale County, Michigan
Townships in Michigan